Dercas gobrias is a butterfly in the family Pieridae. It was described by William Chapman Hewitson in 1864. It is found in the Indomalayan realm.

Subspecies
Dercas gobrias gobrias (Borneo)
Dercas gobrias herodorus Fruhstorfer, 1910 (Peninsular Malaysia, Singapore, Sumatra)

References

External links
Dercas at Markku Savela's Lepidoptera and Some Other Life Forms

Butterflies described in 1864
Coliadinae
Butterflies of Asia
Taxa named by William Chapman Hewitson